Teresa Ekwutosi Agbomma Meniru  (April 7, 1931 – August 24, 1994) was a Nigerian writer of young adult literature and children's stories.

Early life 
Teresa Ekwutosi Agbomma was born in Ozubulu, in Anambra State.

Career 
Meniru wrote books for young readers. Her work deals with difficult subjects such as child abuse, kidnapping, the status of women in Nigeria and the burden of tradition. Meniru has also written about the effects of war on women, such as in her book, The Last Card. Meniru's writing was part of a trend in Nigerian writing that "broadened the scope of African children's and young adult literature by introducing themes and approaches that are relevant to postcolonial times."

Personal life 
Teresa Ekwutosi Agbomma married engineer Godwin Udegbunam Meniru, a Howard University graduate. They had four sons and three daughters together. She died in 1994, aged 63 years.

Selected works 
 
 
 
 
 
Uzo. Evans Bros. .

References

External links 

 Henrietta C. Otokunefor, Obiageli C. Nwodo, Nigerian Female Writers: A Critical Perspective (Lagos: Malthouse 1989).

1931 births
1994 deaths
Igbo people
 People from Anambra State
21st-century Nigerian women writers